Lorraine Hanson may refer to:

Lorraine Hanson (footballer) (born 1959), English footballer
Lorraine Hanson (sprinter) (born 1965), English sprinter